Chaenopsis resh is a species of chaenopsid blenny found in coral reefs around Venezuela and Colombia, in the western central Atlantic Ocean. It can reach a maximum length of  TL.

References
 Robins, C. R. and J. E. Randall 1965 (28 Oct.) Three new western Atlantic fishes of the blennioid genus Chaenopsis, with notes on the related Lucayablennius zingaro. Proceedings of the Academy of Natural Sciences of Philadelphia v. 117 (no. 6): 213–234.

resh
Fish described in 1965